La Pineda is a coastal resort which forms part of the municipality of Vila-seca in the province of Tarragona, in Catalonia, Spain.

Culture

Attractions
The main attraction in La Pineda is a water park, "Aquopolis", in the central street. The local beaches are also very popular with tourists.

Beaches
 Platja de La Pineda
 Platja dels Prats
 Platja del Racó

See also
 Salou
 Reus

Populated places in the Province of Tarragona